The Juno Award for "Jazz Album of the Year - Solo" has been awarded since 2015, as recognition each year for the best jazz album of a solo artist in Canada.

Winners

References 

Jazz Album of the Year - Solo
Jazz awards
Awards established in 2015
2015 establishments in Canada

Album awards